The 2022 Supercopa Argentina (officially the Supercopa Argentina Betsson 2022 for sponsorship reasons) was the 9th edition of the Supercopa Argentina, an annual football match contested by the winners of the Primera División and Copa Argentina competitions.

The match was played between Boca Juniors (winners of 2022 Primera División) and Patronato (winners of 2021–22 Copa Argentina) on 1 March 2023 at Estadio Único Madre de Ciudades in Santiago del Estero.

At the beginning, it had been announced that the final would be held in Abu Dhabi, nevertheless, on 30 December 2022, the Argentine Football Association announced that the cup would be played in a local venue. The decision was taken after a meeting where it was also determined that only teams considered part of the big five clubs would travel to Abu Dhabi to meet the commitments taken. The president of Patronato, Oscar Lenzi, agreed with the decision alleging economic reasons.

On December 29, Abu Dhabi was confirmed as host of the International Supercup, while the local version would be played in Argentina as usually.

Boca Juniors defeated Patronato 3–0 to win their second Supercopa Argentina title.

Qualified teams
 Note: Bold indicates winners

Match

Details

Statistics

References 

2022 in Argentine football
2022
Boca Juniors matches